Amra Sadiković (born 6 May 1989) is a Swiss tennis player. She announced her retirement in May 2014, a few days after her 25th birthday, only to begin playing 13 months later on the ITF Women's Circuit again. In April 2019, Sadiković announced her second and permanent retirement from professional tennis. She had another comeback in October 2022 at Sharm El Sheik.

In her career, Sadiković won eight singles titles and 15 doubles titles on the ITF Circuit. On 18 July 2016, she reached her best singles ranking of world No. 126. On 10 October 2016, she peaked at No. 135 in the WTA doubles rankings.

In 2016, Sadiković made her Grand Slam main-draw debut at Wimbledon. She won three rounds of qualifying before facing defending (and eventual) champion Serena Williams in the first round, where she lost in straight sets.

Sadiković has a win–loss record of 7–6 for Switzerland in Fed Cup competition.

ITF finals

Singles: 13 (8 titles, 5 runner-ups)

Doubles: 34 (15 titles, 19 runner-ups)

References

External links

 
 
 
 Official website 

1989 births
Living people
Sportspeople from Prilep
Swiss female tennis players
Macedonian emigrants to Switzerland
Swiss people of Macedonian descent
Swiss people of Bosnia and Herzegovina descent